Where's the Party? is the fifth studio album by American rock musician Eddie Money. The album was released in October 1983, by Wolfgang Records and Columbia Records.

Money described the album as more upbeat and positive than his previous album No Control, saying, "We're ready to rock.... We're all in a party mood, and the album reflects that."

The album peaked at #67 on the Billboard 200 album chart, making it Money's lowest-charting album up to that time. Critic Lennox Samuels of Independent Press Service wrote in his review, "The party's not on this record, anyway. Side 1 is an undistinguished assortment of mid- to uptempo rock tunes." Samuels did praise the track "The Big Crash", which he described as "a bouncy dance tune with an effective interplay between John Nelson's lead guitar and Duane Hitchings' synthesizer," and noted that "Leave It to Me" appeared to show Money "venturing into new music", with a sound close to that of many popular synth-bands of the time.

In a 1986 interview promoting his following album, Can't Hold Back, Money stated that Where's the Party? "sold about 280,000 units. For the money I spent on it, it wasn't enough."

Where's the Party? was Eddie's last album to carry the Wolfgang Records logo.

Track listing

Singles
"The Big Crash" (1983) #54 US Billboard (22 weeks)
"Club Michelle" (1984) #66 US Billboard (7 weeks)

Personnel
 Eddie Money – vocals, saxophone on tracks 1 & 7, piano on track 9 
 John Nelson – guitars on tracks 1, 2, 3, 4, 5, 6 & 7, lead on tracks 1, 2, 3, 4, 5, 6 & 7
 Steve Farris – guitars on tracks 1, 2, 3 & 8, lead on track 8
 Frank Linx – guitar on tracks 3 & 6, percussion on track 1
 Jimmy Lyon – all guitars on track 9 
 Ralph Carter – bass, guitar on tracks 6 & 7, rhythm guitar
 Mike Botts – drums on tracks 1, 3, 5 & 6, percussion on track 7
 Gary Ferguson – drums on tracks 4 & 8
 Gary Mallaber – drums on track 2
 Art Wood – drums on track 9
 Randy Nichols – Hammond B3 on tracks 4, 6 & 9, synthesizers on track 9
 Duane Hitchings – synthesizers on tracks 2, 6, 7 & 8
 Mitchell Froom – synthesizers on tracks 3 & 5
 Alan Pasqua – synthesizers on track 1
 Paulinho Da Costa – percussion on tracks 1, 2 & 6

Charts

References

1983 albums
Eddie Money albums
Albums produced by Tom Dowd
Columbia Records albums